Massimo Ardinghi (born 6 March 1971) is a former professional tennis player from Italy. 

Ardinghi enjoyed most of his professional tour tennis success while playing doubles.  During his career he finished runner-up at 2 doubles events.  He achieved a career-high doubles ranking of world No. 111 in 1998.

ATP Tour career finals

Doubles (2 runners-up)

External links
 
 

1971 births
Living people
Italian male tennis players
Sportspeople from Genoa
20th-century Italian people